Stasys Janušauskas (13 May 1902 – 16 February 1996) was a Lithuanian footballer who competed in the 1924 Summer Olympics.

Janušauskas was a defender for ŠŠ Kovas Kaunas when he got called up to represent Lithuania at the 1924 Summer Olympics in Paris, France, where they lost in the first round against Switzerland 0–9. Over the next two years Janušauskas played four more internationals.

References

1902 births
1996 deaths
Sportspeople from Liepāja
People from Courland Governorate
Lithuanian footballers
Lithuania international footballers
Footballers at the 1924 Summer Olympics
Olympic footballers of Lithuania
Association football defenders